The Oregon Territorial Legislature was the legislative branch of the government of the Oregon Territory of the United States, from 1849 to 1858. The legislature was a bicameral body, including a larger "House of Representatives," headed by a Speaker of the House, and a 9-member "Council," headed by the President of the Council. With the coming of Oregon statehood in 1859, the Oregon Territorial Legislature was supplanted by a new body, the Oregon Legislative Assembly.

This list includes all members of the Oregon Territorial Legislature, divided first by year of the annual session, secondarily divided alphabetically by legislative body. Political parties are indicated when known (D-Democratic, W-Whig, FS-Free Soil Party, R-Republican).

1849 

The 1st Oregon Territorial Legislative Session was held from July 16 to September 29, 1849. Although there were 18 legislative districts for the House, only 17 names appear in archival records of the session, no representative for District 5 being indicated.

House (Speaker: Asa L. Lovejoy)

 Samuel T. Burch, Polk
 William W. Chapman, D-Champoeg
 Jacob S. Conser, Linn
 John Alexander Dunlap, Linn
 Absalom J. Hembree, D-Yamhill
 David Hill, Tualatin
 James Duval Holman, Clackamas
 H. N. V. Holmes, Polk
 William M. King, Polk

 Robert Crouch Kinney, W-Yamhill
 Asa L. Lovejoy, D-Clackamas
 William Tyndall Matlock, Champoeg
 Charles J. Mulkey, Benton
 Michael T. Simmons, Clatsop, Lewis, & Vancouver
 Green Berry Smith, Benton
 Gabriel Walling, Clackamas
 Jerome B. Walling, Yamhill

Council (President: Samuel Parker)

 Wilson Blain, Tualatin
 William Wentworth Buck, Clackamas
 Nathaniel Ford, Polk
 James B. Graves, Yamhill
 Augustus L. Humphrey, Benton
 Washington B. Maley, Linn
 Samuel T. McKean, Clatsop, Lewis, & Vancouver
 Samuel Parker, Champoeg
 Wesley Shannon, Champoeg

1850 

The 2nd Oregon Territorial Legislative Session was held from December 2, 1850 to February 8, 1851.

House (Speaker: Ralph Wilcox)

 William Allphin, D-Linn
 Joseph C. Avery, D-Benton
 Hector Campbell, Clackamas
 Matthew Deady, D-Yamhill
 Samuel M. Gilmore, Yamhill
 Benjamin F. Harding, D-Marion
 H. N. V. Holmes, Polk
 William M. King, D-Washington
 William Tyndall Matlock, W-Clackamas

 William Parker, Marion
 Truman P. Powers, Clackamas, Lewis & Clark
 Aaron Payne, Yamhill
 William T. Shaw, Marion
 Benjamin Simpson, Clackamas
 Wayman St. Clair, Benton
 John Thorp, Polk
 Elias L. Walters, Linn
 Ralph Wilcox, Washington

Council (President: William W. Buck)

 William Wentworth Buck, Clackamas
 Lawrence Hall, Washington
 Augustus L. Humphrey, Benton
 James McBride, Yamhill
 Samuel T. McKean, Clatsop, Clark, & Lewis
 Washington B. Maley, Linn
 Richard Miller, Marion
 Samuel Parker, Marion
 Frederick Waymire, Polk

1851

The 3rd Oregon Territorial Legislative Session was held from December 1, 1851 to January 21, 1852. The size of the House of Representatives expanded from its original 18 to 22 members effective with this session.

House (Speaker: William M. King)

 William Allphine, Linn
 John A. Anderson, D-Clatsop & Pacific
 Joseph C. Avery, D-Benton
 Zebulon C. Bishop, Washington
 Daniel F. Brownfield, W-Clatsop & Pacific
 Wilie W. Chapman, D-Marion
 George Edward Cole, Benton
 George Law Curry, Clackamas
 James Davidson, D-Marion
 Joseph W. Drew, Umpqua
 Nathaniel Ford, D-Polk

 Absalom J. Hembree, D-Yamhill
 James S. Holman, Polk
 William M. King, Washington
 Robert Crouch Kinney, Yamhill
 William Tyndall Matlock, Clackamas
 Samuel McSween, Yamhill
 David M. Risdon, Lane
 Benjamin Simpson, D-Marion
 Aaron E. Waite, W-Clackamas
 Luther White, Linn
 Ralph Wilcox, Washington

Council (President: Samuel Parker)

 Matthew Deady, D-Yamhill
 Joseph M. Garrison, Marion
 Lawrence Hall, Washington
 Augustus L. Humphrey, Benton, Lane, & Umpqua
 Columbia Lancaster, D-Clarke & Lewis
 Asa L. Lovejoy, D-Clackamas
 Washington B. Maley, Linn
 Samuel Parker, D-Marion
 Frederick Waymire, Polk

1852

The 4th Oregon Territorial Legislative Session was held from December 6, 1852 to February 3, 1853. The size of the House of Representatives expanded once again, this time from 22 to 25 members effective with this session.

House (Speaker: Benjamin F. Harding)

 John A. Anderson, Clatsop & Pacific
 Thomas N. Aubrey, Lane
 Joseph C. Avery, D-Benton
 John Carey, Yamhill
 Francis A. Chenoweth, W-Clark & Lewis
 George Edward Cole, D-Benton
 Jacob S. Conser, Marion
 Royal Cottle, Linn
 James Curl, Linn
 Edward J. Curtis, Douglas
 Isaac N. Ebey, Thurston
 James Monroe Fulkerson, Polk
 Addison Crandall Gibbs, W-Umpqua

 John R. Hardin, Jackson
 Benjamin F. Harding, Marion
 H. N. V. Holmes, Polk
 Franklin B. Martin, Yamhill
 William Tyndall Matlock, Clackamas
 Israel Mitchell, Washington
 John Richardson, Yamhill
 Benjamin Simpson, Marion
 Benjamin Stark, Washington
 Milton Tuttle, Washington
 Aaron E. Waite, Clackamas
 Lot Whitcomb, Clackamas

Council (President: Matthew Deady)

 Matthew Deady, D-Yamhill
 Joseph M. Garrison, D-Marion
 Lawrence Hall, W-Washington
 Augustus L. Humphrey, D-Benton & Lane
 Asa L. Lovejoy, W-Clackamas
 Lucius W. Phelps, W-Linn
 Levi Scott, W-Umpqua, Douglas & Jackson
 Fredrick Waymire, D-Polk

1853

The 5th Oregon Territorial Legislative Session was held from December 5, 1853 to February 2, 1854. A 26th member was added to the House of Representatives effective with this session.

House (Speaker: Zebulon C. Bishop)

 George H. Ambrose, D-Jackson
 James A. Bennett, D-Benton
 Zebulon C. Bishop, D-Washington
 Reuben P. Boise, D-Polk & Tillamook
 Lafayette F. Cartee, D-Clackamas
 Fendal Carr Cason, D-Clackamas
 B. F. Chapman, D-Benton
 Elias F. Colby, D-Marion
 Albert Alonzo Durham, W-Washington
 Luther Elkins, D-Linn
 Washington Smith Gilliam, D-Polk
 Stephen Goff, W-Lane
 La Fayette Grover, D-Marion

 Henry G. Hadley, D-Lane
 Orlando Humason, D-Yamhill
 Benjamin B. Jackson, D-Clackamas
 Franklin B. Martin, D-Yamhill
 John F. Miller, D-Jackson
 Joab W. Moffitt, D-Clatsop
 Chauncey Nye, W-Jackson
 John C. Peebles, D-Marion
 Andrew J. Shuck, D-Yamhill
 Isaac N. Smith, D-Linn
 Lewis S. Thompson, W-Douglas
 Robert Thompson, D-Washington
 Alexander B. Westerfield, D-Yamhill

Council (President: Ralph Wilcox)

 Augustus L. Humphrey, D-Benton & Lane
 James K. Kelly, D-Clackamas
 Truman P. Powers, D-Clatsop
 Lucius W. Phelps, D-Linn
 Benjamin Simpson, D-Marion
 James Monroe Fulkerson, D-Polk
 Levi Scott, Umpqua, W-Douglas & Jackson
 Ralph Wilcox, D-Washington
 John Richardson, D-Yamhill

1854

The 6th Oregon Territorial Legislative Session was held from December 4, 1854 to February 1, 1855.

House (Speaker: Lafayette F. Cartee)

 David H. Belknap, Washington
 Hugh L. Brown, Linn
 Ira F. M. Butler, Polk
 Lafayette F. Cartee, Clackamas
 George W. Coffinberry, Clatsop
 James B. Condon, Columbia
 Clark P. Crandall, Marion
 Charles S. Drew, Jackson
 Patrick Dunn, Jackson
 Luther Elkins, Linn
 Nathaniel Ford, Marion
 James F. Gazley, Douglas
 Ralph Carey Geer, Marion
 Jacob Gillespie, Lane
 Absalom J. Hembree, Yamhill

 Anson G. Henry, Yamhill
 Rowland B. Hinton, Benton
 H. N. V. Holmes, Polk
 Orlando Humason, Wasco
 Robert Ladd, Umpqua
 David Logan, Multnomah
 Asa L. Lovejoy, Clackamas
 Alex McIntire, Jackson
 Andrew W. Patterson, Lane
 Delazon Smith, Linn
 William A. Starkweather, Clackamas
 Wayman St. Clair, Benton
 Elisha S. Tanner, Washington
 Jesse Walker, Jackson

Council (President: James K. Kelly)

 E. H. Cleaveland, Jackson
 James Monroe Fulkerson, Polk
 George W. Greer, Columbia & Washington
 Augustus L. Humphrey, Benton & Lane
 James K. Kelly, Clackamas & Wasco
 John C. Peebles, Marion
 Lucius W. Phelps, Linn
 John Richardson, Yamhill
 Levi Scott, Umpqua & Douglas

1855

The 7th Oregon Territorial Legislative Session was held from December 1, 1855 to January 31, 1856.

House (Speaker: Delazon Smith)

 Major C. Barkwell, Jackson
 Reuben P. Boise, Polk & Tillamook
 George Briggs, Jackson
 George W. Brown, Multnomah
 Hugh L. Brown, Linn
 Heman C. Buckingham, Benton
 Augustus R. Burbank, Yamhill
 Philo Callender, Clatsop
 Jonathan M. Cozad, Umpqua
 Nathaniel H. Gates, Wasco
 Bunnell Payne Grant, Linn
 La Fayette Grover, Marion
 John E. Hale, Jackson
 William P. Harpole, Marion
 John Harris, Columbia

 John M. Harrison, Marion
 William Hutson, Douglas
 Hyer Jackson, Multnomah & Washington
 Horatio Van Veighton Johnson, Washington
 Andrew McAlexander, Lane
 Isaac R. Moores, Lane
 James Officer, Clackamas
 Orville Risley, Clackamas
 John Robinson, Benton
 Andrew J. Shuck, Yamhill
 Delazon Smith, Linn
 Thomas Smith, Jackson
 Hiram Straight, Clackamas
 William Tichenor, Coos
 Frederick Waymire, Polk

Council (President: Ammi P. Dennison)

 Ammi P. Dennison, Multnomah
 Charles Drain, Linn
 James Monroe Fulkerson, Polk & Tillamook
 James K. Kelly, Clackamas & Wasco
 Noah Huber, Yamhill
 Hugh D. O'Bryant, Umpqua, Douglas & Coos
 John C. Peebles, Marion
 John E. Ross, Jackson
 Avery A. Smith, Benton & Lane

1856

The 8th Oregon Territorial Legislative Session was held from December 1, 1856 to January 29, 1857.

House (Speaker: La Fayette Grover)

 William Allen, Yamhill
 Joseph C. Avery, Benton
 Samuel E. Barr, Columbia
 James A. Bennett, Benton
 Alexander M. Berry, Jackson & Josephine
 George W. Brown, Multnomah
 Hugh L. Brown, Linn
 Robert B. Cochran, Lane
 Felix A. Collard, Clackamas
 Jacob S. Conser, Marion
 Thomas J. Dryer, Multnomah & Washington
 Nathaniel H. Gates, Wasco
 La Fayette Grover, Marion
 William P. Harpole, Marion
 Horatio Van Veighton Johnson, Washington

 Asa L. Lovejoy, Clackamas
 William J. Matthews, Josephine
 Joab W. Moffitt, Clatsop
 James S. Monroe, Lane
 William Ray, Linn
 Amos E. Rogers, Coos & Curry
 Aaron Rose, Douglas
 Andrew J. Shuck, Yamhill
 Delazon Smith, Linn
 Thomas Smith, Jackson
 John Stanton Miller, Jackson
 William. A. Starkweather, Clackamas
 Walter M. Walker, Polk & Tillamook
 Andrew J. Welch, Polk
 David C. Underwood, Umpqua

Council (President: James K. Kelly)

 James R. Bayley, Yamhill & Clatsop
 Thomas R. Cornelius, Washington, Multnomah, & Columbia
 Charles Drain, Linn
 Nathaniel Ford, Polk & Tillamook
 James K. Kelly, Clackamas & Wasco
 Hugh D. O'Bryant, Umpqua, Douglas & Coos
 John C. Peebles, Marion
 John E. Ross, Jackson
 Avery A. Smith, Lane & Benton

1857

The 9th Oregon Territorial Legislative Session was held from December 7, 1857 to February 5, 1858. There were also Special Pre-Admission Sessions held from July 5 to 9, 1858 and from September 13 to 14, 1858.

House (Speaker: Ira F. M. Butler)

 George Able, Marion
 William Allen, Yamhill
 Ransom S. Belknap, Jackson & Josephine
 H. H. Brown, Jackson
 Hugh L. Brown, Linn
 Ira F. M. Butler, Polk
 Eli C. Cooley, Marion
 Felix A. Collard, Clackamas
 James Cole, Umpqua
 Anderson Cox, Linn
 Nelson H. Cranor, Linn
 Thomas J. Dryer, Multnomah & Washington
 Nathaniel H. Gates, Wasco
 Samuel P. Gilliland, Clackamas
 Benjamin Hayden, Polk & Tillamook

 Reuben C. Hill, Benton
 William M. Hughes, Jackson
 Joseph Jeffers, Clatsop
 Horatio Van Veighton Johnson, Washington
 William M. King, Multnomah
 T. G. Kirkpatrick, Coos & Curry
 James W. Mack, Lane
 Albert A. Matthews, Douglas
 George Rees, Clackamas
 Andrew J. Shuck, Yamhill
 James H. Slater, Benton
 Joseph G. Spear, Josephine
 Francis M. Warren, Columbia
 John Whiteaker, Lane
 Jacob Woodsides, Marion

Council (President: Hugh D. O'Bryant)

 Alexander M. Berry, Jackson & Josephine
 Thomas R. Cornelius, Washington, Multnomah, & Columbia
 Charles Drain, Linn
 Nathaniel Ford, Polk & Tillamook
 Hugh D. O'Bryant, Umpqua, Douglas & Coos
 Thomas Scott, Yamhill & Clatsop
 Edward Shiel, Marion
 Avery A. Smith, Lane & Benton
 Aaron E. Waite, Clackamas & Wasco

1858

The 10th (and final) Oregon Territorial Legislative Session was held from December 6, 1858 to January 22, 1859. Oregon was admitted to the Union on February 14, 1859, becoming the 33rd American state.

House (Speaker: Nathaniel H. Gates)

 Benjamin F. Bonham, Marion
 Wilson Bowlby, Washington
 William W. Chapman, Lane
 James Cole, Umpqua
 Thomas J. Dryer, Multnomah
 Nathaniel H. Gates, Wasco
 Dolphes Brice Hannah, Clackamas
 Absalom F. Hedges, Clackamas
 H. N. V. Holmes, Polk & Tillamook
 Daniel S. Holton, Josephine
 Berryman Jennings, Clackamas
 William S. Jones, Lane
 James H. Lasater, Marion
 Abraham E. McGee, Douglas
 Daniel Newcomb, Jackson & Josephine

 Henry B. Nichols, Benton
 Wilder W. Parker, Clatsop
 Erasmus D. Shattuck, Washington & Multnomah
 James H. Slater, Benton
 Isaac Smith, Polk
 John H. Smith, Yamhill
 John H. Stevens, Marion
 William Riley Strong, Columbia
 William Tichenor, Coos & Curry
 William G. T'Vault, Jackson
 Stephen Watson, Jackson

Council (President: Charles Drain)

 Alexander M. Berry, Jackson & Josephine
 Thomas R. Cornelius, Multnomah, Columbia, & Washington
 Charles Drain, Linn
 Nathaniel Ford, Polk & Tillamook
 James Hendershott, Columbia & Washington
 James W. Mack, Lane & Benton
 Hugh D. O'Bryant, Umpqua, Coos, Curry, & Douglas
 Samuel Parker, Marion
 George H. Steward, Yamhill & Clatsop
 Aaron E. Waite, Clackamas & Wasco

Footnotes 

Oregon Territory

Oregon legislative sessions